Anukul Chandra Mukerji  (1888–1968) was an Indian academic, thinker, writer and a professor of philosophy at Allahabad University. He was known for his studies on the philosophy of European thinkers such as Immanuel Kant and Georg Wilhelm Friedrich Hegel, psychologists like William James, John B. Watson, and James Ward as well as the Advaita Vedanta of Adi Shankara. He was the author two notable books, Self, Thought, and Reality and The Nature of Self, and several articles and is known to have employed western methodology and language styles in his academic pursuit. The Government of India awarded him the third highest civilian honour of the Padma Bhushan, in 1964, for his contributions to education and literature.

References

External links 
 

Recipients of the Padma Bhushan in literature & education
1888 births
1968 deaths
Academic staff of the University of Allahabad
20th-century Indian philosophers
20th-century Indian writers
20th-century Indian male writers